Nageia fleuryi is a species of conifer in the family Podocarpaceae.
Its wood is highly valued and used for musical instruments, chop sticks, fine crafts and household tools.

References

Podocarpaceae
Trees of China
Trees of Indo-China
Trees of Taiwan
Near threatened plants
Taxonomy articles created by Polbot